Chinwe Ohajuruka is a green Architect born in Nigerian. She divides her time between Nigeria and the United States for projects. She became the Sub-Saharan African Laureate for the Cartier Women's Initiative Awards in France in 2015 for her contribution in affordable green houses and social entrepreneurship.

Career
Ohajuruka is the CEO, Architect, Sustainability Consultant and Project Manager for Comprehensive Design Services, a company that designs and builds solar affordable housing; a company she founded in 2012. Her company produces housing using a technique called Bio-Climatic Design, that uses design strategies and engineering techniques that are suited to the local climate, and incorporated solar powered wells. She moved to the U.S. from Nigeria in 2003.

Awards
Ohajuruka was named a "Great Energy Challenge Innovator" and awarded a grant by National Geographic for her project in Port Harcourt, Nigeria, Affordable housing with renewable energy for Nigeria. She also received a Science and Technology award from the Chenving Foundation. She was awarded a Cartier Women's Initiative Award. Her company has also received grants from the USAID and Western Union Foundation.

References

Living people
1960 births
Nigerian women architects